Steele County Courthouse may refer to:

Steele County Courthouse (Minnesota), Owatonna, Minnesota
Steele County Courthouse (North Dakota), Finley, North Dakota